Kharma International B.V., usually known as Kharma, is a High-end audio equipment manufacturer producing mainly loudspeakers and cables.

History
The company was founded Oosterum Loudspeaker Systems (O.L.S. Audiotechnology) in 1982 by Charles van Oosterum. 

In 1984 Kharma was the first company to use ceramic material as membrane in their driver units.

After starting international promotion at the C.E.S. in 1997 and expanded sales from the Netherlands to the United States and the Far East.

References

Audio equipment manufacturers of the Netherlands
Loudspeaker manufacturers